The fourth season of the American television series Warehouse 13 premiered on July 23, 2012, on Syfy. The season consists of 20 episodes, and aired on Mondays; the first ten episodes aired at 9 pm, but the series moved to a 10 pm timeslot starting with the eleventh episode. The show stars Eddie McClintock, Joanne Kelly, Saul Rubinek, Allison Scagliotti, Genelle Williams and Aaron Ashmore.

Cast

Main
 Eddie McClintock as Pete Lattimer
 Joanne Kelly as Myka Bering
 Saul Rubinek as Artie Nielsen
 Allison Scagliotti as Claudia Donovan
 Genelle Williams as Leena
 Aaron Ashmore as Steve Jinks

Special guest
 Anthony Michael Hall as Walter Sykes 
 Brent Spiner as Brother Adrian
 James Marsters as Bennett Sutton / The Count of St. Germain
 Polly Walker as Charlotte Dupres
 Anthony Stewart Head as Paracelsus
 Joel Grey as Monty the Magnificent

Recurring
 C. C. H. Pounder as Mrs. Irene Frederic
 Roger Rees as James MacPherson
 Jaime Murray as Helena G. Wells
 Kate Mulgrew as Jane Lattimer
 Sasha Roiz as Marcus Diamond
 Faran Tahir as Adwin Kosan
 Kelly Hu as Abigail Cho
 Josh Blaylock as Nick Powell

Guest

Special appearance by
 Cherie Currie as herself

Production
On August 11, 2011, it was announced that Warehouse 13 was renewed for a fourth season of thirteen episodes to air in 2012. On January 13, 2012, Syfy extended the order by seven episodes, bringing the total to twenty episodes. On May 15, 2012, Allison Scagliotti announced on Twitter that Season 4 will debut on July 23, 2012. Brent Spiner and Sam Huntington are set to join season four as guest stars, with Spiner to play Brother Adrian, leader of an intensely secretive sect; and Huntington as Ethan, a jazz musician. Aaron Ashmore was upgraded to a series regular in episode three "Personal Effects". For the second half of the season, Polly Walker will appear in several episodes as Charlotte Dupres. In April 2013, it was announced that Anthony Head had been cast as a villain named Paracelsus, and would appear in the final three episodes of the fourth season.

Episodes

Notes

References

General references

External links

 
 

4
2012 American television seasons
2013 American television seasons
Split television seasons